The Place de la Bastille is a square in Paris where the Bastille prison once stood, until the storming of the Bastille and its subsequent physical destruction between 14 July 1789 and 14 July 1790 during the French Revolution. No vestige of the prison remains.

The square straddles 3 arrondissements of Paris, namely the 4th, 11th and 12th. The square and its surrounding areas are normally called simply Bastille. The July Column (Colonne de Juillet) which commemorates the events of the July Revolution (1830) stands at the center of the square.  Other notable features include the Bastille Opera, the Bastille subway station and a section of the Canal Saint Martin.  Prior to 1984, the former Bastille railway station stood where the opera house now stands.
 
The square is home to concerts and similar events. The north-eastern area of Bastille is busy at night with its many cafés, bars, night clubs, and concert halls. As a consequence of its historical significance, the square is often the site or point of departure of political demonstrations, including the massive anti-CPE demonstration of 28 March 2006.

History

Early history of the Bastille 

The Bastille was built between 1370 and 1383 during the reign of King Charles V as part of the defenses of Paris, the structure was converted into a state prison in the 17th century by Richelieu, who was king Louis XIII's chief minister. At that time it primarily housed political prisoners, but also religious prisoners, "seditious" writers, and young rakes held at the request of their families. It began to acquire a poor reputation when it became the main prison for those taken under lettres de cachet issued by the King of France.

By the late 18th century, the building was made up of eight close-packed towers, around 24 m (80 ft) high, surrounding two courtyards and the armoury. The prisoners were held within the 5-7 story towers, each having a room around 4.6 m (15 ft) across and containing various articles of furniture. The infamous cachots (dungeons), the oozing, vermin-infested subterranean cells were no longer in use, since the respective reigns of Louis XV and Louis XVI, who both worked on reforming the penal system in France. The governor of the prison was given a daily allowance per prisoner, the amount depending on their status—from nineteen livres per diem for scientists and academics down to three for commoners. Although its prisoners' conditions were better than in many other prisons in France, including the dreaded Bicêtre in Paris, popular literary accounts focused on the Bastille as a place of horror and oppression and a symbol of autocratic cruelty.

Storming of the Bastille 

The confrontation between the commoners and the Ancien Régime ultimately led to the people of Paris storming the Bastille on 14 July 1789, following several days of disturbances. At this point, the prison was nearly empty, with only seven inmates: four counterfeiters, two madmen, and a young aristocrat who had displeased his father. The regular garrison consisted of about 80 'invalides' (veteran soldiers no longer capable of service in the field) under Governor Bernard-René de Launay. They had however been reinforced by a detachment of 32 grenadiers from one of the Swiss mercenary regiments summoned to Paris by the Monarchy shortly before 14 July. 

A crowd of around 600 people gathered outside around mid-morning, calling for the surrender of the prison, the removal of the guns and the release of the arms and gunpowder. Two people chosen to represent those gathered were invited into the fortress and slow negotiations began.

In the early afternoon, the crowd broke into the undefended outer courtyard and the chains on the drawbridge to the inner courtyard were cut. A spasmodic exchange of gunfire began; in mid-afternoon the crowd was reinforced by mutinous Gardes Françaises of the Royal Army and two cannons. De Launay ordered a ceasefire; despite his surrender demands being refused, he capitulated and the victors swept in to liberate the fortress at around 5:30.

Later history 

On 16 June 1792, the area occupied by the Bastille was turned into a square celebrating liberty, and a column would be erected there. The first stone was laid by Palloy; however, construction never took place, and a fountain was built instead in 1793.

In 1808, as part of several urban improvement projects for Paris, Napoléon planned to have a monument in the shape of an elephant built here, the Elephant of the Bastille. It was designed to be 24 m (78 ft) in height, and to be cast from the bronze of cannons taken from the Spanish. Access to the top was to be achieved by a stairway set in one of the legs. However, only a full-scale plaster model was built. Victor Hugo immortalized the monument in the novel Les Misérables where it is used as a shelter by Gavroche. The monument was demolished in 1846.

In 1833, Louis-Philippe decided to build the July Column as originally planned in 1792. It was inaugurated in 1840.

The area today 

The former location of the fort is currently called Place de la Bastille. It is home to the Opéra Bastille. The large ditch (fossé) behind the fort has been transformed into a marina for pleasure boats, the Bassin de l'Arsenal, to the south, which is bordered by the Boulevard de la Bastille. To the north, a covered canal, the Canal Saint-Martin, extends north from the marina beneath the vehicular roundabout that borders the location of the fort, and then continues for about 4.4 kilometers to the Place de la Bataille-de-Stalingrad.

On Thursdays and Sundays, a large, open-air market occupies part of the park to the north of the Place de la Bastille, along the Boulevard Richard-Lenoir. Consumers can find fresh fruit, fish, meat, cheese and bread along with clothing and typical flea market items.

Some undemolished remains of one tower of the fort were discovered during excavation for the Métro (rail mass-transit system) in 1899, and were moved to a park (the Square Henri-Galli) a few hundred metres away, where they are displayed today. The original outline of the fort is also marked on the pavement of streets and pathways that pass over its former location, in the form of special paving stones.  A café and some other businesses largely occupy the location of the fort, and the Rue Saint-Antoine passes directly over it as it opens onto the roundabout of the Bastille.

Gallery

See also

 Bastille
 Bastille Day

External links

Satellite image from Google Maps
Images of the July Column (Insecula)
Gilded statue, Génie de la Liberté, at the summit of the Column (Webshots user photo - links to bigger version)
L'Éléphant de la Bastille
Place de la Bastille  current photographs and of the years 1900
 The 1974 Bastille day Parade onf the Place de la Bastille, full video broadcast by the French National Audiovisual Institute

 

 
1792 establishments in France
Buildings and structures completed in 1792
Bastille
Storming of the Bastille
Bastille
Buildings and structures in the 4th arrondissement of Paris
Buildings and structures in the 11th arrondissement of Paris
Buildings and structures in the 12th arrondissement of Paris
Bastille